Ethnic Chinese refers to Han Chinese people, who are an East Asian ethnic group native to China.

Ethnic Chinese may also refer to:

 Chinese people, people or ethnic groups associated with China

Overseas Chinese, people of Chinese birth or descent living outside greater China
Zhonghua minzu, a political term to refer to all ethnic groups native to China

See also
Chinese (disambiguation)
Chinese people
Ethnic minorities in China
List of ethnic groups in China